Scanavino is a surname. Notable people with the surname include: 

Antonella Scanavino (born 1992), Uruguayan swimmer, daughter of Carlos
Carlos Scanavino (born 1964), Uruguayuan swimmer
Emilio Scanavino (1922–1986), Italian painter and sculptor
Peter Scanavino (born 1980), American actor